Alejandro Sánchez Palomero (born 6 November 1986) is a triathlete and former S8 swimmer from Spain.

Swimming 
In 2007, Sánchez competed at the IDM German Open.  Sánchez competed at the 2010 IPC World Championships in the Netherlands, finishing seventh in the 100 breaststroke and eighth in the 200 individual medley. In 2013, he competed in the Championship of Spain by Autonomous Open Paralympic Swimming where he represented the Balearic Islands.

Paralympics 
Sánchez competed at the 2008 Summer Paralympics, winning a bronze medal in the 100 meter S8 breaststroke.  He competed at the 2012 Summer Paralympics, where he did not medal.

References

External links 
 
 

1986 births
Living people
Spanish male breaststroke swimmers
Spanish male triathletes
Paratriathletes of Spain
Paralympic swimmers of Spain
Paralympic bronze medalists for Spain
Paralympic medalists in swimming
Swimmers at the 2008 Summer Paralympics
Swimmers at the 2012 Summer Paralympics
Paratriathletes at the 2020 Summer Paralympics
Medalists at the 2008 Summer Paralympics
Medalists at the 2020 Summer Paralympics
S8-classified Paralympic swimmers